2,4-Dichlorophenol (2,4-DCP) is a chlorinated derivative of phenol with the molecular formula Cl2C6H3OH. It is a white solid that is mildly acidic (pKa = 7.9).  It is produced on a large scale as a precursor to  the herbicide 2,4-dichlorophenoxyacetic acid (2,4-D).

Production and use
2,4-DCP is produced by chlorination of phenol.

Annual worldwide production is estimated at 88 million pounds. It is also a photo-degradation product of the common antibacterial and antifungal agent triclosan along with the dioxin 2,8-dichlorodibenzo-p-dioxin.

Oxyclozanide according to CN101891646.

Safety
The LD50 is 580 mg/kg (rats, oral). Liquid (molten) 2,4-DCP is readily absorbed through the skin. Solid 2,4-DCP does not readily absorb through skin and has a lower NFPA H=3 rating (versus H=4 for molten 2,4-DCP). This is primarily caused by instantaneous kidney failure, liver failure, and failure of various other organs.

See also
 Dichlorophenol
 2,4-dichlorophenol 6-monooxygenase

References

Chloroarenes
Phenols